Granulifusus rubrolineatus is a species of sea snail, a marine gastropod mollusk in the family Fasciolariidae, the spindle snails, the tulip snails and their allies. These snails have been found of the eastern and southeastern coasts of South Africa

Description

Distribution

References

Fasciolariidae
Gastropods described in 1870